Prophylaxis in medicine means measures taken to prevent, rather than treat, diseases.

Prophylaxis or prophylactic may also refer to:
Dental prophylaxis
Dental antibiotic prophylaxis
A prophylactic or condom
Prophylaxis (chess)
Prophylactic rule, in constitutional law